Eretmocera albistriata is a moth of the family Scythrididae. It was described by Henry Legrand in 1966. It is found on the Seychelles (Aldabra).

References

albistriata
Moths described in 1966